Tommaso Struzzieri, C.P. (30 March 1706 – 21 January 1780) was a Roman Catholic prelate who served as Bishop of Todi (1775–1780), Bishop of Amelia (1770–1775), and Titular Bishop of Tium (1764–1770).

Biography
Tommaso Struzzieri was born in Senigallia, Italy on 30 Mar 1706 and ordained a priest in the Congregation of the Passion by Pope Benedict XIII in 1729.
On 12 October 1764, he was appointed during the papacy of Pope Clement XIII as Coadjutor Bishop of Ajaccio and Titular Bishop of Tium.
On 23 December 1764, he was consecrated bishop by Giulio Cesare Viancini, Archbishop of Sassari. 
On 10 September 1770, he was appointed during the papacy of Pope Clement XIV as Bishop of Amelia.
On 18 December 1775, he was appointed during the papacy of Pope Pius VI as Bishop of Todi.
He served as Bishop of Todi until his death on 21 January 1780 .

References 

18th-century Italian Roman Catholic bishops
Bishops appointed by Pope Clement XIII
Bishops appointed by Pope Clement XIV
Bishops appointed by Pope Pius VI
1706 births
1780 deaths
Passionist bishops